The following low-power television stations broadcast on digital or analog channel 44 in the United States:

 K44EN-D in Methow, Washington, to move to channel 36

The following low-power stations, which are no longer licensed, formerly broadcast on digital or analog channel 44:
 K44AK-D in Memphis, Texas
 K44AM in Carlin, Nevada
 K44CC-D in Gruver, Texas
 K44CG-D in Capulin, etc., New Mexico
 K44CK in Chelan, Washington
 K44CP in Eureka, Nevada
 K44DD in Chama, New Mexico
 K44DF in Glenwood Springs, Colorado
 K44DN in Paso Robles, California
 K44DZ in Klamath Falls, Oregon
 K44EK in Fairbanks, Alaska
 K44EL in Ouray, Utah
 K44FH-D in Coos Bay, Oregon
 K44GD in Crownpoint, New Mexico
 K44GG in Murdo, South Dakota
 K44HA-D in Preston, Idaho
 K44HH in Lubbock, Texas
 K44HJ in Socorro, New Mexico
 K44KR-D in Salinas, California
 K44LG-D in Anderson, Pineville, Missouri
 K44LL-D in Austin, Nevada
 KIDT-LD in Stamford, Texas
 KINE-LP in Robstown, Texas
 KSDI-LD in Fresno, California
 KTJH-LP in Ukiah, California
 W44BO in Pinconning, Michigan
 W44CN in Greenville, North Carolina
 W44CT-D in Albany, New York
 W44CU-D in Florence, South Carolina
 W44CV-D in Utuado, Puerto Rico
 W44DK-D in Clarksburg, West Virginia
 WBXP-CA in Memphis, Tennessee
 WCRD-LP in Carthage, Illinois
 WLPH-CD in Miami, Florida
 WNDS-LD in Ocala, Florida

References

44 low-power